Mohamed "Ben" Salem (May 24, 1940 in Oran, French Algeria – May 4, 2008 in Belfort, France) was an Algerian association football player who spent most of his career with CS Sedan. He started his career as a striker before ending his career as a defender. He is CS Sedan's second all-time top scorer with 107 goals for the club, including 81 goals in the French top flight.

Club career
 -1956 MC Oran
 1956-1959 FC Saint-Rémy de Provence
 1959-1964 UA Sedan-Torcy
 1964-1967 Daring de Bruxelles
 1967-1972 RC Paris-Sedan

Honours
 Won the Coupe de France once with UA Sedan-Torcy in 1961
 Won the Ligue 2 Championship once with RC Paris-Sedan in 1972
 Finalist of the Coupe Drago once with UA Sedan-Torcy in 1963
 Second all-time scorer for CS Sedan with 107 goals
 Scored 81 goals in Ligue 1
 Has 4 caps for the Algerian National Team (1963–1968)

References

1940 births
2008 deaths
Algerian footballers
Algeria international footballers
Footballers from Oran
Ligue 1 players
Ligue 2 players
CS Sedan Ardennes players
R.W.D. Molenbeek players
Belgian Pro League players
MC Oran players
Expatriate footballers in Belgium
Expatriate footballers in France
Algerian expatriate sportspeople in Belgium
Algerian expatriate sportspeople in France
Algerian expatriate footballers
Association football forwards
21st-century Algerian people